Kalaiyarkoil is a town in the Sivaganga district of Tamil Nadu, India. It has a total of 43 panchayat villages.

website: www.kalaiyarkovil.com

References

External links 

Sivaganga District Directory

Revenue blocks of Sivaganga district